Alexander Zane Reid Lowe (born 7 August 1973) is a New Zealand radio DJ, live DJ, record producer, and television presenter.

After an early career in music creation, production and DJing, he moved to the UK in 1997. He came to prominence through presenting on XFM and MTV Europe (MTV Two), developing a DJ career by opening sets for bands and eventually landing a slot on prime-time radio on BBC Radio 1 from 2003–2015, with the trademark 'Zane Lowe's World Record', airing the UK's best and hottest in music.

In 2015, he was head-hunted by Apple to be the Creative Director of their new world-wide music station, Apple Music 1.

Early career
Born in Auckland, Lowe attended Auckland Grammar School and was a presenter on local music station Max TV. Zane was a member of Urban Disturbance, an early 90s hip hop group whose standout hit was "No Flint No Flame" and Breaks Co-Op, alongside Andy Lovegrove and Hamish Clark. Lowe and Clark formed Breaks Co-Op in Auckland, releasing the electronic album Roofers in 1997 before they both left New Zealand to travel and pursue other interests. Both would eventually develop their careers in the UK.

International DJ

Lowe relocated to the UK in 1997. He initially worked at the Record and Tape Exchange in Notting Hill, before being asked to cover for a show on XFM, going on to host XFM's Music Response. In 2003, he joined BBC Radio 1, showcasing new music from around the world.

Also a successful international DJ, he has played sets at festivals including Coachella, Future Music Festival in Australia, Glastonbury, Creamfields and Bestival. He has toured with artists including, Skrillex, The Prodigy, Kasabian and The Weeknd and opened shows for both Muse and Foo Fighters at their concerts at Wembley Stadium. As well as being a regular performer at Ibiza and Mallorca Rocks, Lowe is also Musical Director for the brand, helping to develop and build their artistic and musical output.

Lowe on MTV 
Lowe started his career on MTV UK before moving to MTV2 Europe (now MTV Rocks) presenting shows such as MTV News (1998-2001), MTV News Daily Edition (1999-2001) and Brand:New (1999). From 2002 to 2015, he presented Gonzo, its flagship music show. The show evolved from a two-hour random collection of presenting and clips, to a primetime (7pm) show featuring regular musical guests and interviews. The show was presented solely by Lowe, with the studio effectively being a blue screen and 'Brown Couch'. His presenting manner on Gonzo was more laid back than on his radio show. The show featured music videos, music news and input from the channel's message boards. The show also featured mock interview done by a character called Ginger Bloke, in which popular musical artists were humorously "interviewed." Occasionally, moderators of the boards (chosen on Gonzo and by the members) contributed; one member even filled in for a week when Lowe was too unwell to present. At Oxegen Festival 2006, Zane Lowe was reportedly "beaten up" by Didz Hammond and Carl Barât from Dirty Pretty Things on an episode of Gonzo. He has since said that the punch was in fact completely playful but unfortunately, and painfully, connected with his groin.

BBC Radio 1
Lowe's BBC Radio 1 evening show was broadcast from 2003 to 2015, occupying a 7-9PM timeslot on Mondays to Thursdays every week. Lowe's method of DJing was high octane and fast-paced, The show developed a number of features including "Hottest Record In The World Right Now", "masterpieces" and the "Zane Lowe Meets" interviews, including interviews with Jay-Z, Kanye West, Chris Martin, Twenty One Pilots, Eminem and Rick Rubin.

On 15 February 2015 it was announced that Lowe would be leaving BBC Radio 1 in March 2015 to launch a new station with Apple. Lowe presented his last show on 5 March 2015, bowing out with "Song for the Dead" by Queens of the Stone Age, from their 2002 album Songs for the Deaf.

Masterpieces
Between 2007 and 2012, one week per year of Lowe's show was dedicated to albums considered "masterpieces". Each show focused on a different album which Lowe and his team considered to be a classic. The first half of the show was dedicated to interviews and an in-depth look at the album's cultural impact, with the album being played in full in the second half of the show.

In 2011, during a 21 November broadcast of "Masterpieces" featuring The Smashing Pumpkins, Lowe expressed his delight at securing the opportunity to play Siamese Dream in full, stating the album to be one of his favourites. Three days later, Lowe announced that 2011 could possibly be the final edition of "Masterpieces", concluding the show with "Hallelujah" from Jeff Buckley's album Grace, stating that the idea of the feature originally came from the suggestion that the album Grace be played on the air from beginning to end. However, Lowe later announced that "Masterpieces" would continue in 2012, with the four chosen albums being announced on 6 November 2012. Lowe himself stated that 2012 was a slightly different year of selection, in that the team chose albums that were of "pure quality, but [haven't] necessarily featured on any traditional 'greatest albums' lists."

Apple Music 1 
At the 2015 Apple WWDC Keynote, Lowe was introduced as one of the DJs of Apple Music 1 (previously Beats 1), a radio station part of Apple Music. He is also the host of the Apple Music show Planet of the Apps.

Awards and nominations
Lowe has been the recipient of NME Awards and Radio Academy Awards. Lowe has also won the Gold Award in the Specialist Music Programme and Music Broadcaster of the Year categories at the Radio Academy Awards. Lowe recently won the Gold 'Music Radio Broadcaster of the Year' award at the Radio Academy Awards 2014 and, in early 2015, was nominated for a Grammy Award for his writing and production on Sam Smith's hit album In the Lonely Hour.

Ryan Jarman incident
Lowe is remembered for saving Ryan Jarman's life at the 2006 NME Awards, an incident which NME now refers to as "engraved in indie folklore". The incident occurred when Jarman's band, the Cribs, accepted an award on behalf of winners Franz Ferdinand. While on his way to collect the trophy from presenter Russell Brand, Jarman dived onto the Kaiser Chiefs' table and pierced his back with broken glass, narrowly missing his vital organs. He was taken to hospital but discharged himself to return for the show's after-party later in the night. However, his injuries were severe and he fell unconscious in a back corridor. Lowe, a fellow guest at the party, found Jarman lying on the floor bleeding profusely and another ambulance was called which took Jarman to hospital where doctors stitched up the injuries along with the ones the first surgeon had missed.

Discography

Remixes

Writing and production credits

References

External links

1973 births
Living people
New Zealand DJs
New Zealand record producers
New Zealand expatriates in England
BBC Radio 1 presenters
New Zealand television presenters